Robert Selden Garnett may refer to:

Robert S. Garnett (1819–1861), U.S. Army officer and Confederate Army general
Robert S. Garnett (congressman) (1789–1840), Virginia congressman and lawyer